Vernon Pahl (born February 19, 1957) is a Canadian former professional football player. Pahl played nine seasons with the Winnipeg Blue Bombers of the Canadian Football League. He was drafted by the Winnipeg Blue Bombers in the third round of the 1980 CFL Draft. Pahl played CIS football at the University of Prince Edward Island.

References

External links
Just Sports Stats

Living people
1957 births
Players of Canadian football from Quebec
Canadian football linebackers
UPEI Panthers football players
Winnipeg Blue Bombers players
Canadian football people from Montreal
Anglophone Quebec people